The Things We Left Behind is the twelfth studio album released by Canadian country rock band Blue Rodeo, released on November 10, 2009.  It is their first studio double album.

The album was a longlisted nominee for the 2010 Polaris Music Prize.

Formats
The Things We Left Behind is available as two CD's, two 180 gram LP's (which also included both CD's), and as a digital download.

Track listing

CD 1/LP 1
 "All the Things that Are Left Behind"
 "One More Night"
 "Waiting for the World"
 "Never Look Back"
 "Sheba"
 "One Light Left in Heaven"
 "Million Miles"
 "Gossip"

CD 2/LP 2
 "Don't Let the Darkness in Your Head"
 "Arizona Dust"
 "In My Bones" 	
 "Candice" 	
 "Wasted"
 "You Said"
 "And When You Wake Up"
 "Venus Rising" 10:34

Chart performance

Certifications

References

Blue Rodeo albums
2009 albums